= American Society of Ophthalmic Plastic and Reconstructive Surgery =

Association for specialized oculoplastic surgeons

- Founded: 1969
- Headquarters: 1041 Grand Avenue #132, St. Paul, MN 55105
- Website: https://www.asoprs.org/

The American Society of Ophthalmic Plastic and Reconstructive Surgery (ASOPRS) is a professional membership society dedicated to education, research, and the quality of clinical practice in oculofacial plastic surgery. Members include individuals who are highly trained in oculofacial plastic surgery, have unrestricted license to practice medicine, and received certification from the American Board of Ophthalmology.

== History ==
Founded in 1969, ASOPRS has almost 1,000 members who are dedicated to orbital and facial reconstruction and disorders of the eyelids, eye socket, and tear drainage system. The purpose of ASOPRS is to advance education, research, and the quality of clinical practice in the fields of aesthetic, plastic and reconstructive surgery specializing in the face, orbits, eyelids, and lacrimal system. The society also has a philanthropic arm (ASOPRS Foundation) established in 1999 that provides educational, humanitarian project, and research grants in the field of oculofacial plastic surgery. It is also referred to as The Oculofacial Society as a public facing name to provide a name that is easier to remember and clearer about the expertise of members.

== Requirements ==
There are 3 pathways to become a ASOPRS member.

Internal pathway for those who complete a ASOPRS approved fellowship. These are two year full time fellowship programs with academic institutions. In order to be considered for this fellowship, the applicants have to have finished a ACGME approved ophthalmology residency. There are over 60 fellowship training programs throughout the country and have specific written and oral board examinations upon completion of fellowship.

External pathway for surgeons with seven years or more experience focused on oculofacial plastic surgery. They are also required to have active participation in research, teaching, and or advocacy in oculofacial plastic surgery. Concurrently, they need to be living and practicing in the United States or Canada while having certification for practice in either country and active fellow membership in the American Academy of Ophthalmology.

International Associate pathway for candidates that have either successfully completed a ASOPRS approved international fellowship or are a member of a reciprocal society such as the British Oculoplastic Surgery Society (BOPSS), European Society of Ophthalmic plastic and Reconstructive Surgery (ESOPRS), Mexican Society of Oculoplastics, or Asia Pacific Society of Ophthalmic Plastic & Reconstructive Surgery (APSOPRS).

== Specialization ==
Members of ASOPRS signify surgeons who have expertise and training specialized in surgery around the eyes. ASOPRS credentials are considered the gold standard in the field of oculoplastic surgery and recognize surgeons highly trained specifically for these surgeries. This includes procedures such as Eyelid surgery (Blepharoplasty), Eyebrow lifts, Laser skin resurfacing, Tear duct surgery (Dacryocystorhinostomy), Repairing facial trauma, and benign and malignant tumor removal surgeries.

ASOPRS is not just a membership formality and instead has specific additional requirements. It requires specific fellowship training that is specific to oculofacial region. Surgeons not only have to finish four years of internships and residencies in ophthalmology and plastic surgery but also two years of fellowship training through competitive programs at medical educational programs. Additionally, they have two sets of board exams instead of the traditional one set of board exams for general plastic surgeons.
